Staunton Creek is a neighbourhood in the Southern District of Hong Kong Island, in Hong Kong. It is west of Wong Chuk Hang, north of Sham Wan, and east of Aberdeen.

Staunton Creek became urbanised only in the 1960s as one of the major light industrial areas in Hong Kong. Its fortune has been in decline since the 1990s, when large numbers of manufacturers relocated from Hong Kong to mainland China.

As of the 2010s Staunton Creek is in a state of transition: attracted by cheap rents, improved transport connection, and proximity to the tourist areas of Aberdeen and Ocean Park, several office towers have been built, a number of art galleries and restaurants have moved into empty factory floors, and several hotels, including L'hotel Island South and Ovolo Southside, have opened.

Economy
The fashion company I.T has its head office on the 31st floor of Tower A of Southmark in Staunton Creek.

Landmarks

Features of Wong Chuk Hang include:
 Holy Spirit Seminary
 Wong Chuk Hang Estate
 Staunton Creek Nullah

References 

Southern District, Hong Kong
Areas of Hong Kong